Daniel Taylor (born 1948) is an American writer. He is the author of nine books, including The Myth of Certainty, Letters to My Children, Tell Me A Story: The Life-Shaping Power of Our Stories, In Search of Sacred Places: Looking for Wisdom on Celtic Holy Islands, and, appearing in autumn/fall 2011, Creating a Spiritual Legacy: How to Share Your Stories, Values, and Wisdom. He speaks frequently at conferences, colleges, retreats, and churches on a variety of topics. Taylor is also co-founder of The Legacy Center, an organization devoted to helping individuals and organizations identify and preserve the values and stories that have shaped their lives. He was a contributing editor of Books and Culture.

A recurring topic in Taylor’s work is the role of stories in shaping lives. He points out that we are born into stories, live in stories, and die leaving a legacy of stories. Stories, he argues, are the single best way human beings have discovered for preserving and making sense of their experience, and understanding this increases one’s ability to make one’s own life story a rich one.

In addition to his books and articles, Taylor has served as a stylist for several Bible translations, including the New Living Translation and a revision of the New Century Version. He also co-produced The Expanded Bible (2011).

Taylor received his B.A. from Westmont College in Santa Barbara, California and an M.A. and Ph.D in English from Emory University in Atlanta, Georgia. He taught literature and writing at Bethel University for thirty-three years.

Personal life
Taylor is married and the father of four children. He currently resides in Saint Paul, Minnesota.

Selected publications

The Myth of Certainty (1986, IVP Books, 1999) 
Letters to My Children: A Father Passes on His Values (1989, Bog Walk Press, 2010) 
Tell Me a Story: The Life-Shaping Power of Our Stories (Bog Walk Press, 2001)  (Originally published as The Healing Power of Story, Doubleday, 1996)
Before Their Time: Lessons in Living from Those Born Too Soon (InterVarsity Press, 2000) 
Is God Intolerant?: Christian Thinking about the Call for Tolerance (Tyndale House Publisher, 2003) 
In Search of Sacred Places: Looking for Wisdom on Celtic Holy Islands (Bog Walk Press, 2005) 
The Expanded Bible (Thomas Nelson, 2009) 
Creating a Spiritual Legacy: How to Share Your Stories, Values, and Wisdom (Brazos Press, 2011) 
Death Comes for the Deconstructionist (Wipf and Stock)

Online writings

Rest for the Weary: Eliot’s Four Quartets, Books and Culture, January/February 2009 
How to Pick a President: Why Virtue Trumps Policy, Christianity Today, June 2008 
Living with a Big Poem: Reflections on the Waste Land, Books and Culture, September/October 2005 
Many Bibles, One Scripture: The Gift of Translation, Books and Culture, September/October 2002 
Wizards and Hobbits, Books and Culture, May/June 1996 
In Pursuit of Character, Part I, Christianity Today, December 1995 
In Pursuit of Character, Part II, Christianity Today, December 1995

References

External links 
Daniel Taylor's Website 
Daniel Taylor's Speaker Biography for the Calvin College Festival of Faith and Writing  
Daniel Taylor's Amazon Author Page 
Daniel Taylor's Biography from Image (journal) 

1948 births
Living people
American non-fiction writers
Christian writers
Westmont College alumni
Emory University alumni